An overall is a type of garment which is usually used as protective clothing when working.

Overall may also refer to:

Clothing 
 Boilersuit, a garment also known as an overall or overalls
 high-waisted, tightly cut trousers of mess uniforms worn by British Army officers

Places 
 Overall, Tennessee, an unincorporated community
 Overall, Virginia, an unincorporated community in Warren County, Virginia
 Overall Creek, a Tennessee tributary of the West Fork of the Stones River

Other uses 
 Overall (surname)
 Overall deal, where a network has the rights to all the output of a production company

See also
 Overall length
 Length overall, where overall is sometimes abbreviated as o/a, o.a. or oa
 Dressing overall
 Overhall Grove
 Overhaul (disambiguation)
 Øvrevoll